Tilden Lake is a community in Ontario, Canada, about  from North Bay along Highway 11. It is in the unorganized North Part of the Nipissing census subdivision. The community is administered by a local services board.

History

Tilden Lake was a timber mill in the 1920s and '30s and part of the '40s.  The mill was owned by the Ellesmere Brothers and employed over 500 strong lumberjacks and millers.  A fire destroyed the mill and it shut down for good in the early 1950s for economic reasons. However, a few families stayed behind and made the commute to nearby North Bay and Temagami. The main village road was named for the brothers and now is called the village road and Ellesmere. The actual Tilden Lake was the upper lake where the timber was left to take on water before it was "run" down the river to Elbo Lake to be processed in the mill. Men would go out and "run" the logs down the river, a dangerous undertaking.

References

Communities in Nipissing District
Local services boards in Ontario